Cassius Clay (soon Muhammad Ali) fought Duke Sabedong in a ten-round boxing match in Las Vegas on June 26, 1961. The fight went the full distance with Clay winning comfortably on points, despite Sabedong's usage of roughhouse tactics.

The fight's special significance rests on Clay's interactions with Gorgeous George during the pre-match promotional activities related to the Clay-Sabedong bout, and also just after the fight. These interactions would shape Clay's behavior and mannerisms, particularly while promoting his future fights, for the rest of his boxing career.

Notes

References

Sabedong
1961 in boxing
June 1961 sports events in the United States
1961 in sports in Nevada